Chachahuantla is a town in the municipality of Naupan, located in the northwest of the state of Puebla in central Mexico. The town is part of the Sierra Norte region of the state, a steep mountainous area, and borders the state of Hidalgo. The people speak the Nahuatl language and Spanish.

References

Populated places in Puebla
Nahua settlements